This is a list of historic places in Outaouais, Quebec, entered on the Canadian Register of Historic Places, whether they are federal, provincial, or municipal. All addresses are the administrative Region 07. For all other listings in the province of Quebec, see List of historic places in Quebec.

Outaouais